Giuseppe Levati (1739–1828)  was an Italian painter and designer of the late-Baroque and Neoclassicism period.

He was born at Concorezzo, near Milan. After initially working as a decorator, he specialized as an architectural landscape painter, attracted especially the perspectives of Bárbaro and Giampietro Zanotti. In 1802 he was elected director of the school of perspective at Milan. He executed architectural subjects and landscapes (vedute). He helped decorate the house of the Marquis Litta at Lainate; the residence of Count Borromeo, the archducal palace at Milan, and the palace at Monza. One of his pupils was Francesco Durelli.

References

1739 births
1828 deaths
18th-century Italian painters
Italian male painters
19th-century Italian painters
19th-century Italian male artists
Painters from Milan
Italian neoclassical painters
Italian Baroque painters
People from the Province of Monza e Brianza
18th-century Italian male artists